KTVG-TV, virtual channel 17 (UHF digital channel 19), was a Fox-affiliated television station licensed to Grand Island, Nebraska, United States. Prior to June 2009, the station, along with satellite KSNB-TV (channel 4) in Superior, were identified on-air as Nebraska Fox 4 & 17. Beginning June 12, 2009, the stations were simulcast with KFXL-TV (channel 51) in Lincoln. As of mid-August 2009, KFXL became the main station, and the entire network was rebranded as KFXL, Fox Nebraska. KSNB left the air in December 2009 (though it has since resumed operations as a separately-operated NBC and MyNetworkTV affiliate) and KTVG soon followed in April 2010, leaving KFXL as the market's Fox station.

KTVG was owned by Hill Broadcasting Company, but was operated by Pappas Telecasting Companies under a local marketing agreement (LMA) until the expiration of the deal in April 2010. Pappas held the rights to Fox programming in the Lincoln–Hastings–Kearney market. Through this LMA, KTVG was a sister station to KPTM, the Omaha Fox affiliate, and the Nebraska Television Network (NTV), composed of ABC affiliates KHGI-TV in Kearney, KWNB-TV in Hayes Center, and KHGI-CA in North Platte.

History
A construction permit for operation on channel 17 in Grand Island was granted on February 27, 1986; on April 10, it was assigned the call letters KTVG. However, the station did not take to the air until April 2, 1993. Two months later, original owner Family Broadcasting Company agreed to sell KTVG to Hill Broadcasting; the sale was completed on July 14, 1993. That month, the station suspended operations due to flood damage, returning to the air that September. Early on, KTVG was an independent station with a limited schedule, at one point only operating from 3–11 p.m. and devoting much of its broadcast day to cartoons and old movies; by February 1994, it had expanded to a 7 a.m.–midnight schedule and had secured a deal to broadcast Kansas City Royals games in the market.

On April 1, 1994, KTVG's operations were taken over by Fant Broadcasting, owner of the ABC-affiliated Nebraska Television Network (NTV, composed of KHGI-TV, channel 13, and satellites KWNB-TV, channel 6 and KSNB-TV, channel 4), under a local marketing agreement (LMA); Hill Broadcasting's owner, Robert Hill, also ran Fant-owned WNAL-TV in Gadsden, Alabama. KTVG then became an affiliate of the Fox network; this was subsequently supplemented by a secondary UPN affiliation. For several years thereafter, KTVG carried live simulcasts of KHGI's newscasts. Pappas took over KTVG's operations on July 1, 1996, after it agreed to purchase NTV from Fant and immediately assumed control under an LMA; that September, Fant and Pappas converted KSNB-TV from a satellite of KHGI to satellite of KTVG, expanding the availability of Fox programming in central Nebraska. This created an instance of a satellite station older than its parent, as KSNB signed on in 1965.

KTVG and KSNB-TV dropped the secondary UPN affiliation in January 1998; however, the network's programming returned in late 2000, and would remain until KOLN (channel 10) and KGIN (channel 11) launched a UPN-affiliated subchannel on September 1, 2005. The network shut down a year later in favor of The CW, which was seen on KCWL-TV (channel 51) until June 2009, when it became KFXL-TV and started simulcasting KSNB/KTVG. Also in 2000, KSNB and KTVG added a secondary affiliation with Pax TV, renamed i: Independent Television on July 1, 2005, and Ion Television on January 29, 2007. The Ion affiliation was later discontinued.

KSNB and KTVG began broadcasting network programming in high definition on January 1, 2009, prior to the broadcast of the Orange Bowl. In August 2009, KFXL became the main station for branding purposes, with all three stations being referred to as "KFXL, Fox Nebraska". Despite this, KFXL-TV and the "Fox Nebraska" network's low-power analog repeaters received their programming from KTVG-TV. The digital subchannels of the NTV stations carrying KFXL received a direct feed from the studios in Axtell, as did KTVG.

The time brokerage agreement between Pappas Telecasting and Colins Broadcasting Corporation, owner of KSNB-TV, expired on November 30, 2009. As a result, KSNB, along with two translator stations in Lincoln owned by Colins, shut down on December 1. (A third Colins-owned translator, K17CI in Beatrice, Nebraska, had left the air on June 12, 2009.) KSNB subsequently broadcast intermittently as an affiliate of the Three Angels Broadcasting Network; in 2012, Gray Television, the owners of KOLN/KGIN, would acquire KSNB for $1.25 million and make it a MyNetworkTV affiliate, shared with a pre-existing subchannel of KOLN/KGIN.

As of April 2010, KTVG-TV was no longer listed on KFXL ID screens. It was stated on a message board that parent station KHGI-TV announced during a newscast that KTVG-TV shut down on April 5, 2010; this was confirmed by a comment in the station's July DTV education quarterly activity report filed with the FCC.

The KTVG-TV license was canceled by the Federal Communications Commission (FCC) on April 22, 2014; this was due to the 2012 expiration of both its construction permit for its post-digital transition facility on channel 16 (which had been tolled due to a bankruptcy proceeding Hill Broadcasting was involved in) and special temporary authority to continue operating its pre-transition channel 19 digital facility, not operating for over a year, and failure to file for license renewal.

Repeaters
Fox 4 & 17 was seen over six low-power repeaters—all of which were located on the UHF dial.  Only one of the repeaters, KOAZ-LP, is still broadcasting; it now relays Fox 4 & 17's successor, KFXL-TV as digital station KHGP-LD.

A seventh repeater, K13OM in Natoma, Kansas was listed periodically on KSNB/KTVG ID screens, but this repeater was not listed in the FCC database and reports from the Natoma area indicated the repeater was not on the air and a tower did not exist for the repeater. Nonetheless, K13OM was displayed periodically on the station's ID screens as recently as early 2009.

Cable/satellite coverage
KSNB was on Time Warner Cable channel 4 in Lincoln and channel 7 in Superior. It was also carried on numerous smaller cable systems across southeast Nebraska.

In Kearney and Grand Island, Charter Communications carried KTVG on basic channel 4 (as well as a HD feed on a digital tier). Galaxy Cablevision customers in Grand Island and Hall County and Antilles Wireless customers in Kenesaw also received KTVG on channel 4. In Hastings, Charter Communications carried the KTVG standard-definition signal on channel 3 (as well as HD on the digital tier). Glenwood Communications carried KTVG on channel 17 in Blue Hill. Great Plains Cable Television customers in Hayes Center were able to find the station on basic channel 29. It was also carried on numerous smaller cable systems across southern, central, and north-central Nebraska. Its signal was also available as the Fox station on the Lincoln DirecTV and Dish Network local feeds. DirecTV carried the station on channel 17 while Dish Network carried the station on channels 17 and 7553. KFXL has replaced KTVG as the Fox affiliate on all of the above systems.

KFXL is now the only HD Fox affiliate available on Time Warner Cable (now merged with Charter and called Spectrum) systems in Lincoln and points west. KPTM is still carried in HD on Spectrum in areas within the Omaha DMA.

References

External links
 Screen captures at Northpine.com

Defunct television stations in the United States
Pappas Telecasting
Television channels and stations established in 1993
1993 establishments in Nebraska
Television channels and stations disestablished in 2010
2010 disestablishments in Nebraska
TVG-TV
Defunct mass media in Nebraska